Norape cretacea is a moth of the family Megalopygidae. It was described by Walter Hopp in 1922.

References

Moths described in 1922
Megalopygidae